The Armed Forces of Uruguay ( or FF.AA. del Uruguay) consist of an army, navy, and air force. These three branches are constitutionally subordinate to the President of Uruguay through the Minister of Defense. The government has trimmed the armed forces to about 16,800 for the army; 6,000 for the navy; and 3,000 for the air force. As of February 2003, Uruguay has more than 2,500 soldiers deployed on 12 UN Peacekeeping missions. The largest groups are in the Democratic Republic of the Congo and Haiti. There is also a 58-man contingent in the MFO in the Sinai. The current Minister of Defense is Javier García.

Army (Ejército Nacional)

The Army consists of some 15,000 personnel organized into four divisions.

It is equipped with 15 Israeli Ti-67 (T-55) main battle tanks, 17 American M24 and 46 M41A1 Walker Bulldog light tanks, 24 American M113A1 armored personnel carriers, 15 Czech BMP-1 infantry fighting vehicles and 130 OT-64 SKOT APCs, 64 German Condor APCs, 15 Brazilian EE-9 Cascavel and 18 EE-3 Jararaca armored cars, and 48 Russian lightly armored GAZ-3937 amphibious vehicles. In 2008, Uruguay also purchased 44 6x6 Canadian-made AVGP APCs rehabilitated by FAMAE in Chile after retirement from the Canadian Army, receiving a second batch of 100 of Grizzlys and 5 Huskys, the recovery version. It has 4 sets of RM-70 multiple rocket launchers.  The army operates 40 Land Rover Defender 110SW vehicles, and is looking to buy between 30 and 40 more.

The current assault rifle used by the army is the Argentinian-built version of the Belgian FN FAL; it is being replaced by the Austrian Steyr AUG following a bidding contest in 2007 and 2008. In addition, about 300 Russian AK-101s are already used, and the elite airborne, commando, and antiterrorist Battalion 14 (Batallón de Infantería Paracaidista Nro 14) exclusively employ German HK G36s.

The Army will receive locally produced Glock 17 pistols as replacements for its legacy Browning Hi-Power and M1911 pistols.

DIO, an Iranian company, was involved in the bidding to replace the FN FAL with its KH-2002; but since there is a UN embargo banning arms exports from Iran, the company attempted to smuggle the 15,000 test bullets through Venezuela.
This failed and prompted an investigation.

Uruguay special forces are now fielding an indigenous .50 BMG sniper rifle called the FS50 Peregrino.  It is a single-shot bolt-action rifle that was developed in Uruguay for about two years.

The Uruguayan Army was considering buying either the Panzerfaust 3 or RPG-7 as short-range anti-tank weapons. Acquisition of the rockets was cancelled due to lack of funds.

Navy (Armada Nacional)

The Navy consists of about 5,700 personnel under Admiral Jorge Wilson and is organized into four commands: the Fleet Command (Comando de la Flota or COMFLO), the Coast Guard (Prefectura Nacional Naval or PRENA), the Chief Directorate of Naval Materiel (Dirección General de Material Naval or DIMAT), and the Chief Directorate of Naval Personnel (Dirección General de Personal Naval or DIPER).  The Navy General Staff (Estado Mayor General de la Armada or ESMAY) acts as an advisory body to the admiral.

The current fleet consists of 2 ex-Portuguese João Belo class and 1 ex-French Commandant Rivière class (in reserve) frigates, 1 ex-German Lüneburg class auxiliary oil replenisher, 3 Vigilante class and 2 Castrates class patrol boats, 3 ex-East German Kondor II class minesweepers, and other smaller craft.

The Navy also includes a battalion-sized Marine Corps (Cuerpo de Fusileros Navales) and a small naval air station at Laguna del Sauce.

The Uruguayan Naval Academy (Escuela Naval or ESNAL) is located in Carrasco, a suburb of Montevideo. Instruction consists of a 4-year course of study culminating in a cruise on the instructional tall ship ROU Capitán Miranda, which lasts several weeks and takes graduates to various ports around the world.

Air Force (Fuerza Aérea Uruguaya)

The Air Force consists of about 3,000 personnel and organized into three Air Brigades (I, II, & III) and 7 Squadrons.

Combat aircraft consist of Argentine IA-58 Pucarás and Cessna A-37B Dragonflies. Transport aircraft consist of Lockheed C-130s, Brazilian Embraer Bandeirantes and  Embraer Brasilias, Spanish CASA C-212-200 Aviocars, and Cessna 206H Stationairs and T-41D Mescaleros.

Helicopters consist of the Bell UH-1H Iroquois and 212 Twin Huey, the Eurocopter AS-365N2 Dauphin, and the Westland HC-2 Wessex.

The Air Force Academy (Escuela Militar de Aeronáutica) is located at General Artigas Air Base in Pando, Canelones; the Air Force Technical Academy (Escuela Técnica de Aeronáutica) in Toledo Sur, Canelones; and the Air Force Command Academy (Escuela de Comando y Estado Mayor Aéreo) at Captain Boiso Lanza Air Base in Montevideo. Training aircraft consists of Italian Aermacchi SF.260s, Beech Barons, and Swiss Pilatus PC-7 Turbo Trainers.

See also
 Cockade of Uruguay#Military

References

External links 

 Ministerio de Defensa Nacional - Official site of the Uruguayan Department of National Defense (in Spanish)
 Ejército Nacional - Official site of the Uruguayan Army (in Spanish)
 Armada Nacional - Official site of the Uruguayan Navy (in Spanish)
 Fuerza Aérea Uruguaya - Official site of the Uruguayan Air Force (in Spanish)
 Memorias del tiempo de vuelo - Actual and Historical Site about Uruguayan Air Force (in Spanish)
 Uruguay Militaria - Uruguayan armed forces discussion forum (in Spanish)
 World Ranks